Svenner Lighthouse is a coastal lighthouse in the municipality of Larvik in Vestfold og Telemark, Norway. It was first lit in 1874 on the archipelago Svenner. The current tower was built in 1900. The lighthouse was listed as a protected site in 1997, and was automated in 2003.

See also

Lighthouses in Norway
List of lighthouses in Norway

References

External links
 
 Norsk Fyrhistorisk Forening 

Lighthouses completed in 1874
Lighthouses completed in 1900
Lighthouses in Vestfold og Telemark
Listed lighthouses in Norway